Azize Raguig (born 23 January 1975) is a Moroccan boxer. He competed in the men's light heavyweight event at the 2000 Summer Olympics.

References

External links
 

1975 births
Living people
Moroccan male boxers
Olympic boxers of Morocco
Boxers at the 2000 Summer Olympics
Sportspeople from Strasbourg
Light-heavyweight boxers